Gossa (dative: Gossen) is an island in Aukra Municipality in Møre og Romsdal county, Norway.  The island encompasses most of the municipality and has a ferry connection from the village of Aukrasanden across the Julsundet strait to the village of Hollingen on the mainland. About 80% of the municipal population (about 2,500 people) is located on the island.   

The  island is flat and swampy, but it is well cultivated by farmland wherever possible. There are also some planted forests.

The largest population centers on the island are the villages of Aukrasanden and Varhaugvika on the southeastern side and the village of Røssøyvågen on the west side. Aukra Auto runs bus service on the island.  

The natural gas from the Ormen Lange gas field is brought ashore at Nyhamna on the northeastern shore. Here the gas is processed and pumped through the world's longest underwater pipeline, the Langeled pipeline, to Easington in the United Kingdom.

See also
List of islands of Norway

References

External links
http://www.aukra.kommune.no 
http://www.gossen.no
https://www.shell.com/about-us/major-projects/ormen-lange.html

Aukra
Islands of Møre og Romsdal